In mathematics, Kostka polynomials, named after the mathematician Carl Kostka, are families of polynomials that generalize the Kostka numbers.  They are studied primarily in algebraic combinatorics and representation theory.

The two-variable Kostka polynomials Kλμ(q, t) are known by several names including Kostka–Foulkes polynomials, Macdonald–Kostka polynomials or q,t-Kostka polynomials.  Here the indices λ and μ are integer partitions and Kλμ(q, t) is polynomial in the variables q and t.  Sometimes one considers single-variable versions of these polynomials that arise by setting q = 0, i.e., by considering the polynomial Kλμ(t) = Kλμ(0, t).

There are two slightly different versions of them, one called transformed Kostka polynomials.

The one-variable specializations of the Kostka polynomials can be used to relate Hall-Littlewood polynomials Pμ to Schur polynomials sλ:

 

These polynomials were conjectured to have non-negative integer coefficients by Foulkes, and this was later proved in 1978 by Alain Lascoux and Marcel-Paul Schützenberger.

In fact, they show that

 
where the sum is taken over all semi-standard Young tableaux with shape λ and weight μ.
Here, charge is a certain combinatorial statistic on semi-standard Young tableaux.

The Macdonald–Kostka polynomials can be used to relate Macdonald polynomials (also denoted by Pμ) to Schur polynomials sλ:

 

where 
 

Kostka numbers are special values of the one- or two-variable Kostka polynomials:

Examples

References

External links
Short tables of Kostka polynomials
Long tables of Kostka polynomials

Symmetric functions